The Princess and the Cabbie is a  1981 television movie aired on CBS on 3 November 1981 about a young woman who struggles with dyslexia.

The film stars Valerie Bertinelli as Joanna James, an heiress who is sheltered from the real world. One day she meets literary cab driver, Joe Holiday (Robert Desiderio), who references Shakespeare, T. S. Eliot, James Joyce, William Carlos Williams, Albert Einstein, Gustave Flaubert and Agatha Christie. Also starring is Shelley Long. After leaving her book in his cab, Holiday gets to know her and discovers Joanna's secret: she can't read, write, or even remember telephone numbers or directions home. Determining that she is dyslexic, Holiday begins to help her gain independence.

Awards
1982: Emmy Award: Outstanding Achievement in Music Composition for a Limited Series or a Special (Dramatic Underscore)

Nominated:
1982: Emmy Award: Outstanding Cinematography for a Limited Series or a Special

See also
 List of artistic depictions of dyslexia

References

External links

 
TV: 'PRINCESS AND THE CABBIE,' A SICK POOR LITTLE RICH GIRL

1981 television films
1981 films
Dyslexia in fiction
CBS network films
1981 drama films
Films directed by Glenn Jordan